Glærem is a village in Surnadal Municipality in Møre og Romsdal county, Norway.

References

Villages in Møre og Romsdal
Surnadal